Bloomfield Stadium is a football stadium in Tel Aviv, Israel, with a capacity of 29,400. It is the home stadium of Maccabi Tel Aviv, Hapoel Tel Aviv, and Bnei Yehuda Tel Aviv. The stadium also serves the Israel national football team for some select home matches.

History

Bloomfield Stadium was built in Eastern Jaffa, on the land where Basa Stadium, home to Hapoel Tel Aviv since 1950, once stood. Finance for the stadium project came from the Canadian Association of Labour Israel, a Canadian charity supporting the charitable works of the Hapoel Sports Movement of the Histadrut Labour Organization in Israel, the Bloomfield family of Montreal, Canada, directly and through their family foundation called the Eldee Foundation. The project was financed in Canada and intended to honor the names of brothers Bernard M. Bloomfield and Louis M. Bloomfield, Q.C. of Montreal, Canada for their lifelong dedication to the ideals of sport in Israel. The first match at the new stadium was a 1–1 draw between Hapoel and Shimshon Tel Aviv on 13 October 1962. The stadium officially opened on 13 December 1962 on a friendly match between Hapoel and Dutch club Sportclub Enschede.

In 1963, Maccabi Tel Aviv moved into Bloomfield Stadium after hosting of their matches at the Maccabiah Stadium, in 1985 Maccabi left Bloomfield Stadium for the Ramat Gan Stadium and in 2000, Maccabi returned to host at Bloomfield Stadium.

In 1964, Bloomfield Stadium hosted the 1964 AFC Asian Cup.

In 2004, Bnei Yehuda Tel Aviv moved into Bloomfield Stadium making it the only stadium in the top three divisions of Israeli football to have three tenants.

In September 2010, Bloomfield Stadium was granted Category 4 status by UEFA, which will allow it to host Champions League Group stage matches.

It was one of four venues at the 2013 UEFA European Under-21 Football Championship, holding three matches in Group A.

Between 2016 and 2019, it was closed due to renovations for expansion to 29,000 seats. As a result, the three clubs had to play their home matches in Petah Tikva and Netanya up until August 2019.

When Israel allowed concerts to take place again after the COVID-19 pandemic, Bloomfield Stadium was one of the first arenas to let people in for live shows.

On 1 August 2021, Bloomfield Stadium hosted the 2021 Trophée des Champions between Lille and Paris Saint-Germain.

On 31 July 2022, Bloomfield Stadium will host the 2022 Trophée des Champions between Paris Saint-Germain and FC Nantes.

Concert venue
The stadium has hosted musical acts such as Pixies, Soundgarden, Phil Collins, the Black Eyed Peas, Scorpions, Andrea Bocelli, Barbra Streisand, Rihanna.

Gates

International matches

Gallery

See also

List of football stadiums in Israel
Tel Aviv derby
Football in Israel

References

External links

 Bloomfield Stadium the official website
 Bloomfield Stadium on stadiumdb.com
 Bloomfield Stadium on worldstadiums.com
 Bloomfield Stadium on The Stadium Guide

Football venues in Israel
Bnei Yehuda Tel Aviv F.C.
Hapoel Tel Aviv F.C.
Maccabi Tel Aviv F.C.
AFC Asian Cup stadiums
Sports venues completed in 1962
Sports venues in Tel Aviv